Darby and Joan is a phrase referring to a married couple.

Darby and Joan may also refer to:

 Darby and Joan (1920 film), a British film starring Derwent Hall Caine
 Darby and Joan (1937 film), a British film starring Tod Slaughter
 Darby & Joan (album), a 2004 album by Gentleman Reg
 Darby and Joan, a painting by James Charles (painter)
 Darby and Joan a 2022 Australian television series